Luoma is a Finnish surname. Notable people with the surname include:

 Mikko Luoma (born 1976), Finnish professional ice hockey defenceman
 Rauni Luoma (1911–1996), Finnish film actress
 Tapio Luoma (born 1962), Archbishop of Turku

See also
 Tricia Dunn-Luoma (born 1975), American ice hockey player

Finnish-language surnames
fr:Luoma